Baloghiella is a genus of arachnids in the family Haplozetidae. There are at least two described species in Baloghiella.

Species
 Baloghiella granulata Bayartogtokh & Akrami, 2000
 Baloghiella prima Bulanova-Zachvatkina, 1960

References

Further reading

 
 

Sarcoptiformes